Cylinder chess (or cylindrical chess) is a chess variant. The game is played as if the board were a cylinder, with the left side of the board joined to the right side. Cylinder chess is one of six chess variants described by the Arabic historian Ali al-Masudi in 947.

The cylindrical board is used in some chess problems.

Rules and gameplay 
The game is played as if the left and right sides of the board are connected.  When a piece goes off one edge of the board, it reappears from the other edge. For example, it is legal to move a rook from a3 to h3, even if there is a piece on b3, since the rook can move left from a3; a bishop on c1 can move to h4 by going from c1 to a3, and then going up and left from a3 to h4; if White has a pawn on a5, Black has a pawn on h7 and Black plays 1...h7–h5, White can capture the black pawn en passant with 2.axh6; and so on.

Castling can be handled in one of three ways:
 Castling is allowed, but not with a rook over the board edge. This maintains the options for castling available in standard chess.
 Castling is not allowed. Proponents of this convention argue that the purpose of castling is nullified due to all files being equally dangerous on a cylindrical board.
 In addition to normal castling, castling with a rook over the board edge is also allowed. This is done by moving the king two squares toward the rook and moving the rook to the square that the king passed over (in the same manner as usual).

Some cylinder chess problems allow null moves, or moves such that every piece stays in the same place, as long as any piece performing such a move travels a nonzero distance by crossing over the edge of the board. However, most actual games of cylinder chess disallow null moves.

Strategy 

In cylinder chess, the traditional hierarchy of piece strengths is changed, with bishops being significantly stronger than knights. The knight and rook do not gain much more power from the cylindrical board, but bishops and especially queens become stronger. The center squares are unimportant to control, and moving a pawn to the center in the opening is very weakening because it opens the player's center to attacks by the opponent's bishops, which have been allowed faster access to the flank squares.

Cylinder chess also has different endgames than standard chess. For example, unlike in standard chess, a king and rook cannot force checkmate against a lone king on the cylindrical board.

Piece values according to H. G. Muller are as follows:

In chess problems 

The diagram shows a cylinder chess problem that allows null moves. The move 1.Rg4, threatening 2.Rg5#, fails due to 1...Ka5. The solution is to put Black in zugzwang by playing 1.Rh4, moving the rook on h4 to its own square; now, after either 1...Ka5 or 1...c4, 2.R4h5# is mate.

Related variants 

In horizontal cylinder chess, the first and last ranks of the chessboard are connected. In toroidal chess, the board has the form of a torus. A toroidal board can be formed by connecting the first and last ranks of the cylindrical board.

Horizontal cylinder chess and toroidal chess, unlike cylinder chess, cannot use the starting position of standard chess; otherwise, both kings will begin the game in checkmate. The adjacent diagram shows the starting position for toroidal chess on a standard board. In the starting setup, the rooks protect each other while being threatened by the opponent's rooks. They are supported by the knights on the sides of the board, making their positions more defensible.

On the toroidal board, checkmate is impossible with king and queen versus king, but it is possible with king and two rooks versus king.

Notes

References

External links 
Cylinder Chess by George Jelliss, Variant Chess, Volume 3, Issue 22, Winter 1996–67, pages 32–33.
CylinderChess.com Web app for playing cylinder chess online (choice of 3D cylinder or square board), by Tobias Loader
Cylindrical chess by Ron Porter and Cliff Lundberg.
BrainKing.com Internet server for playing Cylinder chess and many other chess variants
Torus Chess by Karl Fischer
Cylinder Chess a simple program by Ed Friedlander (Java)

Chess variants
Chess problems
Fairy chess